Un été avec is a French radio programme and book series produced by France Inter since 2012. Broadcast in the summer, it consists of commentaries and reflections about a famous writer. The material is published as a book the year after the radio broadcast. Series have been made about Michel de Montaigne (2012), Marcel Proust (2013), Charles Baudelaire (2014), Victor Hugo (2015), Niccolò Machiavelli (2016), Homer (2017), Paul Valéry (2018), Blaise Pascal (2019), Arthur Rimbaud (2020), Colette (2021) and Vladimir Jankélévitch (2022).

History
In the summer of 2012, France Inter broadcast Un été avec Montaigne, a radio programme in 40 episodes with analyses of Michel de Montaigne's Essays. The series was written by the literature professor Antoine Compagnon of the Collège de France. It was well received and published as a book the next year by Éditions des Équateurs. France Inter made the series a yearly occurrence, applying the same formula to a famous writer every summer. Compagnon has returned several years but other writers have also written for the programme. Sylvain Tesson was initially approached to make a series about Jack London, but preferred Homer and got his wish granted in 2017. Colette was chosen as subject for the 2021 edition due to a listener complaint that the programme only had covered male writers.

A Summer with Montaigne was published in English translation in 2019.

Series

Reception
Le Figaros Thierry Clermont described the first book, A Summer with Montaigne, as a success and attributed this to the simplicity and pertinence conveyed by Compagnon's presentation of Montaigne's themes. Marion Mayer of Télérama called the programmes about Colette fascinating and wrote that they manage to include much without becoming indigestible.

The books have been commercially successful. A Summer with Montaigne sold 250,000 copies. Tesson's Un été avec Homère sold 200,000 copies.

References

External links
 Official website 

2012 radio programme debuts
Book series introduced in 2013
Books about writers
French public radio programs